Living With Giants  is a feature-length documentary directed by Aude Leroux-Lévesque and Sébastien Rist and produced by MC2 Communication Média in 2016. The filmmakers capture the tragic reality of a young Inuit in the Arctic landscapes of Nunavik.

Plot 
Paulusie, is an innocent teenager, a caring son, and a romantic boyfriend. His only wish is to build a quiet family, and his only joys are hunting and taking care of his loved ones. But for this young inuk, facing the responsibilities that come with adulthood appears less easy as he would imagine. One day Paulusie makes a big mistake heavy of consequences. The young man struggles with guilt and ultimately takes the dramatic decision of taking his own life.

Awards and nominations

References

External links 

2016 films
Indigenous peoples and the environment
Films about suicide
Documentary films about the Arctic
Nunavik
Canadian documentary films
Documentary films about Inuit in Canada
Seal hunting
2010s Canadian films